Paul Rosen (born April 26, 1960) is a Canadian ice sledge hockey goalie and motivational speaker from Thornhill, Ontario.

Career 
Rosen suffered a leg injury during a hockey game as a youth, and the resulting damage, infections, and pain to his leg plagued him for years until his lower leg was amputated at age 39. During rehabilitation, Rosen joined the Canadian National Sledge hockey team and participated in the 2002 and 2006 Winter Paralympics. Rosen was the oldest rookie in the history of the Paralympic Winter Games when he made his debut at 41. At the 2006 Games in Torino, Rosen and the Canadian team won the sledge hockey gold medal.

In January 2007, Rosen made headlines across Canada when his Paralympic gold medal was stolen during an autographing session with fans in Toronto. After commentator Don Cherry told the thief to drop the gold medal in a mailbox during his Hockey Night in Canada broadcast, the medal turned up at a postal sorting station in Toronto and was returned to Rosen. He announced his retirement from the Canadian ice sledge hockey team on September 7, 2010 (along with captain Jean Labonte, Todd Nicholson and Herve Lord).

Rosen also competed in sitting volleyball, another disabled sport. He became a member of Canada's sitting volleyball team at the 2007 Parapan American Games in Rio de Janeiro, Brazil. Rosen was part of the first official international match for Canada's sitting volleyball team when they played the United States on August 15, 2007.

After retiring from competitive sports, Rosen became an official ambassador and spokesperson for National Benefit Authority. When Rosen turned 50, he revealed that he had struggled with literacy his whole life and was returning to school. He then became an ambassador for ABC Life Literacy, to help people conquer the shame and stigma of illiteracy.

Statistics

Rosen spent nine seasons with the Canadian national ice sledge hockey team. By the end of his career, he accumulated a won loss record of 55-15-1. In addition, he registered a 1.04 goals-against average and 25 shutouts in 72 career games.

Hockey Canada

References

External links
 Canadian Paralympic Committee Profile
 Paul’s Story
 Athlete Profile
 Official Website
 



1960 births
Living people
Canadian amputees
Canadian sledge hockey players
Paralympic sledge hockey players of Canada
Paralympic gold medalists for Canada
Ice sledge hockey players at the 2002 Winter Paralympics
Ice sledge hockey players at the 2006 Winter Paralympics
Ice sledge hockey players at the 2010 Winter Paralympics
Medalists at the 2006 Winter Paralympics
Paralympic medalists in sledge hockey